Cytospora elegans is a species of ascomycete fungi in the family Valsaceae.

References 

 Saccardo, P.A. Sylloge Fungorum 3, 1884, page 267

External links 
 Cytospora elegans at MycoBank

Diaporthales
Fungi described in 1854